Phu Soi Dao National Park named after  high Phu Soi Dao mountain, is a protected area at the southern end of the Luang Prabang Range in the Thai/Lao border area, on the Thai side of the range. It is located in Ban Khok and Nam Pat Districts of Uttaradit Province and Chat Trakan District of Phitsanulok Province. The park was established as Thailand's 109th national park in 2008.

Topography
Phu Soi Dao summit is with  the fifth highest in Thailand. There are mixed deciduous forest, dry dipterocarp forest, hill evergreen forest and conifer forest. Several rivers have their source within the park, including Pat and Kwae Noi rivers.

Climate
The park is generally cool all year round. Rainy season is from May to October, average rainfall is /year. Winter is from November to February and summer is from April to June.

History
A survey was set up in November 1990, with an area of only . In August 1993 Phu Soi Dao National Park was proposed, with the inclusion of Phu Soi Dao waterfall. On May 28, 2008, Phu Soi Dao National Park, including Nam Pat forest and Phu Soi Dao forest, with an area of 212,633 rai ~  was declared the 109th national park. Since 2002 this national park has been managed by Protected Areas Regional Office 11 (Phitsanulok).

Flora
Plant species include:

Flowering plant species include:

Orchids species include:

Carnivorous plant species include:

Fauna
In the park are the following mammals:

Birds,the park has some 190 species, of which 130 species of passerine from 32 families, represented by one species:

and some 60 species of non-passerine from 14 families, represented by one species: 

And also reptiles:

Places
 Namtok Phu Soi Dao - a 5-tiered waterfall.
 Lan Son Phu Soi Dao - a broad plain,  at  elevation, Thailand's largest field of "Crested Naga" flowers.         
 Namtok Sai Thip - a 7 tiered waterfall.
 Namtok Pha Chan and Moss - two small waterfalls.
 Yod Phu Soi Dao  - the summit, a flat plain,  at  elevation.

Location

See also
 List of national parks in Thailand
 List of Protected Areas Regional Offices of Thailand

References

External links

Trekthailand - Phu Soi Dao National Park
Phu Soi Dao National Park

National parks of Thailand
Protected areas established in 2008
Luang Prabang Range
Tourist attractions in Phitsanulok province
Tourist attractions in Uttaradit province
2008 establishments in Thailand